The 2022 UEFA Super Cup was the 47th edition of the UEFA Super Cup, an annual football match organised by UEFA and contested by the reigning champions of the top two European club competitions, the UEFA Champions League and the UEFA Europa League. The match featured Spanish club Real Madrid, winners of the 2021–22 UEFA Champions League, and German club Eintracht Frankfurt, winners of the 2021–22 UEFA Europa League. It was played at the Olympic Stadium in Helsinki, Finland on 10 August 2022. The match was also a repeat of the 1960 European Cup Final between both clubs, which was won 7–3 by Real Madrid. The match was the first European club competition fixture featuring the Semi-Automated Offside Technology (SAOT).

Real Madrid won the match 2–0 for their fifth UEFA Super Cup title, a competition record shared with Barcelona and Milan.

Teams

This was Real Madrid's eighth participation in the UEFA Super Cup, winning it four times previously and finishing as runners-up on three previous occasions. It was also Eintracht Frankfurt's first UEFA Super Cup appearance as they attempted to win it for the first time.

Venue

The Helsinki Olympic Stadium was selected as the final host by the UEFA Executive Committee during their meeting in Amsterdam, Netherlands on 2 March 2020. The Albanian Football Association also had bid for the match to be hosted in Tirana, but withdrew prior to the vote, instead focusing on securing the 2022 UEFA Europa Conference League Final.

The match was the first UEFA club competition final to be held in Finland. The stadium was previously used as a venue for the UEFA Women's Euro 2009, where it hosted four group stage matches and the final.

Pre-match

Officials
On 3 August 2022, UEFA named English official Michael Oliver as the referee for the match. Oliver had been a FIFA referee since 2012, officiated at UEFA Euro 2020 and was the referee for the 2015 FIFA U-17 World Cup final. He was joined by fellow countrymen Stuart Burt and Simon Bennett as assistant referees, while Donatas Rumšas of Lithuania served as the fourth official. Tomasz Kwiatkowski of Poland was selected as the video assistant referee (VAR), with compatriot Bartosz Frankowski and Tiago Martins of Portugal serving as the assistant VAR officials.

Match

Summary
Eintracht Frankfurt had the first chance in the match in the 14th minute with Thibaut Courtois saving in a one-on-one from Daichi Kamada. In the 36th minute Kevin Trapp got down to his left to save a low shot from Vinícius Júnior. From the resulting corner Real Madrid went in front when Casemiro headed back from the end line on the right to David Alaba who tapped into the net from close range. Trapp made another save in the 55th minute before Casemiro hit the crossbar from the edge of the box two minutes later. In the 65th minute Vinícius played the ball in from the left to Karim Benzema who made it 2–0 with a shot which the goalkeeper failed to keep out.

Details
The Champions League winners were designated as the "home" team for administrative purposes.

Statistics

See also
2022 UEFA Champions League Final
2022 UEFA Europa League Final
2022 UEFA Europa Conference League Final
2022 UEFA Women's Champions League Final

Notes

References

External links

2022
Super Cup
August 2022 sports events in Finland
Super Cup 2022
2022–23 in Spanish football
Super Cup 2022
2022–23 in German football
International club association football competitions hosted by Finland
2022 in Finnish football
International sports competitions in Helsinki
2020s in Helsinki